The Córdoba Open is a men's ATP World Tour 250 series tournament played on outdoor clay courts. It was held for the first time as part of the 2019 ATP Tour, replacing the Ecuador Open Quito. The tournament takes place at the "Polo Deportivo Kempes", a sports complex next to Estadio Mario Alberto Kempes in Córdoba, Argentina. The tournament is part of the Latin American Golden Swing of the Tour.

Andrés Molteni is the doubles record holder with three victories.

Past finals

Singles

Doubles

References

External links

 

 
Tennis tournaments in Argentina
Clay court tennis tournaments
ATP Tour 250
Recurring sporting events established in 2019